Mariano Rodrigues Amaro (7 August 1914 – 22 May 1987) was a Portuguese football midfielder and manager.

Club career
Amaro was born in Lisbon. He spent his entire career with local club C.F. Os Belenenses, always in the Primeira Liga.

In the 1945–46 season, captain Amaro contributed 22 appearances as the team won the national championship for the first and only time in their history.

International career
Amaro earned the first of his 19 caps for Portugal on 28 November 2017, in a 2–1 friendly win against Spain in Vigo. Before that match he, alongside teammates João Azevedo, Artur Quaresma and José Simões, refused to perform the fascist salute, being subsequently questioned by PIDE.

See also
List of one-club men

References

External links

1914 births
1987 deaths
Footballers from Lisbon
Portuguese footballers
Association football midfielders
Primeira Liga players
C.F. Os Belenenses players
Portugal international footballers
Portuguese football managers
Primeira Liga managers
C.F. Os Belenenses managers